Manulea atratula is a moth of the family Erebidae. It is found in Russia (mountains of southern Siberia, Jakutia, Kolyma), Mongolia and North Korea.

References

Moths described in 1847
Lithosiina